Wooster Square is a neighborhood in the city of New Haven, Connecticut to the east of downtown.  The name refers to a park square (named for the American Revolutionary War hero, David Wooster) located between Greene Street, Wooster Place, Chapel Street and Academy Street in the center of the neighborhood. Wooster Square is also known as Little Italy: a bastion of Italian American culture and cuisine, and is home to some of New Haven's (and the country's), best-known pizza (specifically, apizza) eateries, including Frank Pepe Pizzeria Napoletana and Sally's Apizza. The square and much of the neighborhood are included in the Wooster Square Historic District, which was listed on the National Register of Historic Places in 1971.

An annual Cherry Blossom Festival in Wooster Square Park commemorates the planting of 72 Yoshino Japanese cherry blossom trees in 1973 by the New Haven Historic Commission in collaboration with the New Haven Parks Department and neighborhood residents. The festival, founded and organized by the Historic Wooster Square Association, has grown from a modest event in the early 1970s with a local band entertaining a handful of neighbors under lighted trees to a major New Haven event that in 2016 attracted over 10,000 visitors.

Geography 
The Wooster Square neighborhood consists of the area between the Amtrak railroad tracks (serving as the boundary with Downtown New Haven) and Interstate 91 (between Exits 1 and 3), bounded on the south by the Oak Street Connector. It is bordered on the west by Downtown New Haven, on the south by Long Wharf, on the east by the neighborhood of Mill River, and on the north by East Rock.

History 

Wooster Square takes its name from Revolutionary War General David Wooster, who had a warehouse near Water Street. In 1825 the land was purchased by the city of New Haven and incorporated into the city. At that time, the area was close to the city's waterfront (it is now farther inland due to harbor filling), and by the 1840s it had become a residential area where ship captains and wholesale grocers built large houses near the port. As a result, Wooster Square now includes a concentrated collection of distinctive 19th-century residential architecture, including several buildings by New Haven architect Henry Austin. Included are examples of the Federal, Greek Revival, Islamic Revival, and Italian Villa styles, Late Victorian Italianate row houses, and Second Empire and Queen Anne homes.

By the late 19th century, increased industrial activity in the vicinity made Wooster Square less desirable as a residential neighborhood, and Italian immigrant families began to move in and operate small stores out of their homes. This commercial activity damaged the neighborhood's reputation, and the area was targeted for demolition and redevelopment as early as the 1930s. In the mid-1950s, plans called for building Interstate 91 through Wooster Square Park, but the Wooster Square Project, which started in 1958, began a neighborhood revival and resulted in re-routing of the highway.

Wooster Square made headlines on June 24, 2020 when its Christopher Columbus statue was removed by a city-hired crew in the aftermath of the George Floyd Protests. City officials have since announced the commission of a new statue to replace the Columbus statue. The new statue, which will be just a few feet away from where the Columbus statue stood, will depict an Italian family.

Culture and commerce

Wooster Square is home to restaurants and bakeries known for their pizza and Italian pastries, local businesses, and a weekly farmer's market, City Seed.  Its walkable proximity to Downtown New Haven, its architecture, and its neighborhood feel, make it one of the most sought-after New Haven neighborhoods in which to live.  It also has a thriving art scene.

A sycamore tree on the west side of Wooster Square Park has been said by some observers to resemble an outline image of Jesus Christ.

List of streets

Academy Street
Artizan Street
Bradley Street
Bridge Street
Brown Street
Chapel Street
Chestnut Street
Court Street
Depalma Court
East Street
Fair Street
Forbes Avenue
Franklin Street
Grand Avenue
Greene Street
Hamilton Street
Hughes Place
Ives Place
Jefferson
Lyon Street
New Street
Olive Street
Osborn Street
Saint John Street
Union Street
Wallace Street
Warren Street
Water Street
William Street
Wooster Place
Wooster Street (named for Revolutionary War hero David Wooster)

Notable People 

 Hunter Biden (former resident) - lawyer, second son of President Joe Biden
 Rosa DeLauro (born and raised) - U.S. Congresswoman

See also
Wooster Square Historic District

References

General sources
 Harrison's Illustrated Guide: Greater New Haven 
 Michael Sletcher, New Haven: From Puritanism to the Age of Terrorism, (Charleston, 2004)

Notes

Further reading
 Elizabeth Mills Brown, Historic Houses of Wooster Square, The, ASIN B0007FO856, (1969)
 Mary Hommann, Wooster Square Design, ASIN B0006C97DS, (New Haven Redevelopment Agency, 1965)
 Virginia Marangell, Wooster Square, (2004)

External links 
Wooster Square Historic District, New Haven Preservation Trust website (text excerpt from NRHP nomination, plus gallery of 9 photos)
 Wooster Square photo
 Historic Wooster Square Association

Tourist attractions in New Haven, Connecticut
Neighborhoods in New Haven, Connecticut
Italian-American culture in Connecticut
Little Italys in the United States
Populated places in New Haven County, Connecticut
Historic districts in New Haven, Connecticut
Restaurant districts and streets in the United States
National Register of Historic Places in New Haven, Connecticut